Spondylis buprestoides is bark and wood-boring beetle from the genus Spondylis. These beetles are shiny black and have a cylindrical shape and have large mandibles.

Range
According to observations of the species aggregated on GBIF, this beetle can be found in almost all of Europe. They have also been observed in South Korea and Japan.

References

Cerambycidae